Scotty Burnett (born February 4, 1974 in Sacramento, California) is a former American professional darts player. His nickname is Scotty B.

Career

Burnett won the North American Darts Championship in 2009, defeating Darin Young in the final. He qualified for the 2009 Las Vegas Desert Classic, where he was beaten 6–2 by John Part.

Burnett finished 2nd in the North American Order of Merit, and as a result qualified for the 2010 PDC World Darts Championship. He was defeated 3–0 by 2008 runner-up Kirk Shepherd in the first round.

Burnetts son Tyler Burnett won the CDC Youth Championship and has played on Team USA in the World Cup in Barbados.

World Championship Results

PDC
 2010: 1st Round (lost to Kirk Shepherd 0–3) (sets)

External links
Profile and stats on Darts Database

1974 births
American darts players
Living people
Sportspeople from Sacramento, California
Professional Darts Corporation former pro tour players